To Willie is the fourth full-length album by Phosphorescent, and his second on the Dead Oceans label. The album is a tribute to Willie Nelson, with cover artwork in the style of Nelson's To Lefty From Willie, itself a cover album.

Rhapsody praised the album, calling it one of their favorite cover albums.

Track listing
 "Reasons to Quit" - 3:13
 "Too Sick to Pray" - 2:37
 "Walkin'" - 3:44
 "It's Not Supposed to Be That Way" - 3:35
 "Pick Up the Tempo" - 3:17
 "I Gotta Get Drunk" - 3:38
 "Can I Sleep in Your Arms" - 3:44
 "Heartaches of a Fool" - 3:26
 "Permanently Lonely" - 3:03
 "Last Thing I Needed First Thing This Morning" - 4:26
 "The Party's Over" - 3:53

References

2009 albums
Phosphorescent (band) albums
Dead Oceans albums